Hevisaurus are a Finnish heavy metal band that formed in 2009 with music aimed at children. The band members are known for performing in dinosaur costumes. Hevisaurus's debut concert was at the Elämä Lapselle charity concert on September 9, 2009. Their first tour started at the Tavastia Club in Helsinki on November 22, 2009.

Foundation
After attending a children's music concert with his own children, Mirka Rantanen decided to start a heavy metal band for children. Rantanen and his friends from the Finnish "metalhead" community began writing and recording songs.

Biography
Hevisaurus has released seven albums to date and the albums have sold over 170,000 copies alone in Finland. Localised versions of Hevisaurus’ albums can also be found in Spanish, Hungarian, Swedish and German.

The album ”Hirmuliskojen Yö” (Night of the Dinosaurs) was the 2nd most sold album in Finland in 2010, when the band was rewarded with the best children album Emma (Finnish equivalent to Grammy).

The Dudesons and Hevisaurus opened up an indoor amusement park to Oulu’s Super Park in April 2013.
The band also has their own Hevisaurus game for Android and iOS devices. In the game, players must finish the levels while listening to the band’s songs. The application also includes mini-games like puzzles. The application was released in 2013.

Hevisaurus have their photo on the walls of Hard Rock Café and have also been listed in the Hard Rock Café’s international database of artists/bands. They are the second Finnish band, besides Amorphis, who have received the honor.

Origin story and characters
According to legend, five dinosaur eggs made from metal survived the mass extinction some 65 million years ago in the mountain of wizards. In the year 2009, witches gathered at the same place. A giant lightning bolt hit the ground and simultaneously created ash and revealed the eggs. From the power of the witches’ chants, the eggs exploded open and five Hevisauri hatched.

Movie
The Hevisaurus movie was produced by Solar Films and was filmed in the fall of 2014 and was released in the end of 2015. The movie stars the beloved Hevisaurus characters, as well as famous and rising Finnish actors.

Disagreement with Sony Music
In the beginning of 2011, Mirka Rantanen, the drummer and one of the founding members, fell into a dispute between their record label Sony Music Entertainment about the copyrights and trademarks of the characters. As a result, Rantanen formed a competing band called “Sauruxet”, with the people who played in the Hevisaurus live set-up. The court ordered “Sauruxet” to pay the record label €100,000 and legal fees. Legal documents stated that the rights for the characters had always belonged to Sony Music Entertainment.

Members
"Herra Hevisaurus" (Mr. Hevisaurus) – vocals
"Milli Pilli" – keyboards
"Komppi Momppi" – drums
"Riffi Raffi" – guitars
"Muffi Puffi" – bass

Discography

Albums

Singles

Other singles
2009: "Jurahevin kuninkaat"
2009: "Viimeinen mammutti"
2010: "Saurusarmeija"
2010: "Kurajuhlat"
2011: "Räyh!"
2011: "Tonttuheviä"
2012: "Ugala bugala"
2014: "Aarrejahti"
2015: "Juranoid"

Compilations
 Jurahevin Ikivihreät (2014)

Music videos
 Jee Hevisaurus (2009)
 Viimeinen mammutti (2010)
 Saurusarmeija (2010)
 Yhteinen joulu (2010)
 Räyh! (2011)
 Tonttuheviä (2011)
 Ugala Bugala (2012)
 Avaruuden autokorjaamo (2013)
 Liskodisko (2013)
 Aarrejahti (2014)
 Juranoid (2015)
 100 (2019)

Musicals
 Purppuramysteeri (2010) 
 Eläintarhan yövahti (2011) 
 Salainen tehtävä (2012) 
 Velhojenvuoren salaisuus (2013)

References

External links
Official website (Finnish)
 "HEVISAURUS" at Roadrunner Records
 Hevisaurus - Sony Music Entertainment Finland
 Detailed review of Jurahevin Kuninkaat from Encyclopaedia Metallum
 The story of HeviSaurus and SauruXet

Musical groups established in 2009
2009 establishments in Finland
Finnish power metal musical groups
Finnish children's musical groups
Fictional dinosaurs